Senillé-Saint-Sauveur is a commune in the Vienne department of western France. The municipality was established on 1 January 2016 and consists of the former communes of Senillé and Saint-Sauveur.

See also 
Communes of the Vienne department

References 

Communes of Vienne